Familles je vous hais is a 1997 French comedy drama film directed and written by Bruno Bontzolakis. Caroline Ducey was nominated for the Prix Michel Simon film prize for Best Actress for her performance in the film.

Plot
The film deals with the struggle by the 17-year-old Jessica (Caroline Ducey) trying to reconcile her love for her father with the hatred she has for his right-wing politics.

Cast
Caroline Ducey as  Jessica 
Yvan Kolnik  as  Thierry 
Denis Cacheux as  Jessica's father
Olivier Brabant as  Régis 
Marie Boitel as Jessica's mother
Nadine Pouilly as Thierry's mother

External links

French comedy-drama films
1990s French-language films
1990s French films